Addison M. Starr (c. 1820 – April 30, 1891), better known as A. M. Starr, was an American politician who served as the 9th mayor of Portland, Oregon from 1858 until 1859. He was born in New York and came to live in Portland in 1850, opening a stove and tin store with his brother, Louis (or Lewis).

He lived in San Francisco, California, from 1862 until his death, on April 30, 1891, at the age of 71.

References

Mayors of Portland, Oregon
1891 deaths
Year of birth missing
Oregon Republicans
California Republicans